Major Dr. Surendra Poonia, VSM is an international award-winning sportsman, Limca book record holder, physician, former Special Forces officer of the Indian Army, founder of Soldierathon marathon, Fit Bharat and a politician of Bharatiya Janata Party. He is the first Indian athlete with the rare distinction of having won medals in power-lifting and athletic events in four consecutive world championships. He was born on 1 January 1977 in a farmer family in Sikar, Rajasthan. He is a graduate of the AFMC, Pune.

Career 

Poonia is an alumnus of the Armed Forces Medical College, Pune (AFMC Pune) and Jawahar Navodaya Vidyalaya(JNV),  Patan, Sikar, Rajasthan. Currently, he is an active alumni in JNV Sikar. He was commissioned into the Army Medical Corps in August 2001. He served with The President's Bodyguard at Rashtrapati Bhawan, Special Forces and United Nation's peacekeeping mission in Democratic Republic of Congo.
Major Surendra Poonia joined the Bharatiya Janata Party(BJP) on 23 March before 2019 Lok Sabha General election. After joining the party, Poonia tweeted stating, "I have joined the Bharatiya Janata Party to serve the nation and our people. It is a great honour for me to support and stand with the idea of 'Nation First' against the idea of 'Family First' from party's platform which is led by the honourable Prime Minister Narendra Modi."

Achievements

Major Surendra Poonia represented India in Croatia, Spain, Ireland and Turkey  in 5 World Championships and won 27 medals including 10 Golds. He is the first Indian power-lifter to have won gold in four consecutive championships from 2010 to 2013.
On 26 January 2012, he was felicitated by 'Vishisht Seva Medal'  by The Hon'ble President of Republic of India for his 'Distinguished Service of an Exceptional Order' in the field of sports. He was also awarded 'Most Entertaining Sportsman of the year'-Male by Reliance Big FM in 2013. He is Limca book record holder of most international sports medals won by any Indian doctor.

References

External links 
 Surendra Poonia in JNV Sikar Alumni(1994 batch)
 Major Surendra Poonia's interview podcast

Athletes from Rajasthan
Living people
1977 births
Weightlifters from Rajasthan
Para Commandos
Indian Army personnel